Planorbidella is a genus of sea snails, marine gastropod mollusks in the family Neomphalidae.

Species
Species within the genus Planorbidella include:

 Planorbidella depressa Warén & Bouchet, 1993
 Planorbidella planispira (Warén & Bouchet, 1989)

References

Neomphalidae